I Love You Will U Marry Me was a message added as graffiti to a high concrete bridge at the Park Hill housing estate in Sheffield in April 2001, after the estate was listed at Grade II in 1998 and before renovations began in 2006. The slogan was removed due to maintenance work in 2021, but reinstated in 2022.

History
The words were written quickly with white paint,  in the air, on the side of a bridge crossing over Norwich Street from one block of flats to another at the 13th floor level on the estate. The message was addressed to Clare Middleton, the girlfriend of a young man Jason Lowe, so he could show her his very public declaration of love and marriage proposal from afar after an outing to a cinema.  Clare accepted Jason's proposal, but the pair were never wed, and  Clare later married someone else; she died of cancer in 2007, aged 30. The white message remained in place, visible for miles across the city.

The slogan was adopted by Urban Splash after they were awarded the project to renovate the dilapidated estate from 2006, omitting the name of its addressee and (at that time) without knowing its provenance. The backstory and the original artist were only rediscovered after a BBC Radio 4 documentary first broadcast in 2011.

Both the paint and the neon sign were removed during maintenance in 2021 to widespread consternation, but on the 13th of June 2022, the graffiti was added back to the building, and the next day, the new neon lighting was added on top of it.

Cultural impact
The slogan was included on a replica of the bridge exhibited by architect Jeremy Till in the British Pavilion at the Venice Biennale of Architecture in 2006. It was added to promotional T-shirts printed for Urban Splash, one of which was worn on stage by Alex Turner of the Arctic Monkeys. It was also added to the developer's sale brochures and on cushions in show flats. As the paint faded, Urban Splash commissioned a neon sign in 2011 that was installed on the bridge directly over the words to make them permanent and visible at night, taking inspiration from the neon sign light artworks of Tracey Emin. The Thornbridge Brewery made an "I Love You Will U Marry Me" strawberry blonde ale, bottles of which were presented to buyers of flats. It was the inspiration for several musicians, including a 2012 song "The I Love You bridge" by The Crookes and a 2017 song "I Love You, Will You Marry Me" by Yungblud.

References
  Life size replica on display of the bridge with graffiti - 2006 Echo/City - An Urban Register
 Truth of Sheffield's 'I Love You Will U Marry Me' graffiti, BBC News, 8 August 2011 
 The I Love You Bridge, BBC Radio 4, first broadcast on 7 August 2011
 The I Love You Bridge, Sheffield Civic Trust, 24 March 2012
 The tragic story of Sheffield’s Park Hill bridge, The Observer, 21 August 2016
 I love you will u marry me, Jill Stewart Housing, 12 April 2018
 Sheffield 'I Love You' graffiti removed from Park Hill flats, BBC News, 9 February 2021
 'I Love You Will U Marry Me': Sheffield graffiti removal sparks anger, BBC News, 10 February 2021
 Musicians react angrily to removal of Sheffield’s ‘I Love You Will You Marry Me’ graffiti, NME, 10 February 2021
 https://www.youtube.com/watch?v=oVHqggux-lY The graffiti that Changed a City - Britmonkey, Youtube, 1 May 2021
 https://www.bbc.com/news/uk-england-south-yorkshire-61784910 Sheffield: 'I Love You Will U Marry Me' graffiti reinstated, BBC News, 14th of june 2022
Graffiti and unauthorised signage
Culture in Sheffield
Light art